The Belarusian Premier League is the highest professional basketball league in Belarus.

Current clubs
Tsmoki-Minsk
Tsmoki-Minsk II
Borisfen Mogilev
Grodno-93
Impuls Minsk
BC Rubon
Prinemanye Grodno
GrandPrint
BK Brest Region
GOCOR Gomel Region

Champions

External links
Belarusian Basketball Federation Official Site 
Eurobasket.com League Page

 
Basketball leagues in Belarus
Basketball
Professional sports leagues in Belarus